The term hake  refers to fish in the:
 Family Merlucciidae of northern and southern oceans
 Family Phycidae (sometimes considered the subfamily Phycinae in the family Gadidae) of the northern oceans

Hake
Hake is in the same taxonomic order (Gadiformes) as cod and haddock. It is a medium-to-large fish averaging from 0.5 to 3.6 kg (1 to 8 pounds) in weight, with specimens as large as 27kg (60lb). The fish stay in deep water during the day and come to shallower depths during the night. An undiscerning predator, hake feed on prey found near or on the bottom of the sea. Male and female hake are very similar in appearance.

After spawning, the hake eggs float on the surface of the sea where the larvae develop.

A total of 13 hake species are known in the family Merlucciidae:

Argentine hake (Merluccius hubbsi), found off Argentina
Benguela hake (Merluccius poli), found off South Africa
Deep-water hake (Merluccius paradoxus) found in the southern Atlantic Ocean
European hake (Merluccius merluccius), found off the Atlantic coast of Europe and western North Africa, in the Mediterranean Sea, and in the Black Sea
Gayi hake (Merluccius gayi), found in the North Pacific Ocean
North Pacific hake (Merluccius productus), found in the North Pacific
Offshore hake (Merluccius albidus), found off the United States
Panama hake (Merluccius angustimanus), found in the Eastern Pacific
Senegalese hake (Merluccius senegalensis), found off the Atlantic coast of western North Africa
Shallow-water hake (Merluccius capensis), found in the southern Atlantic Ocean
Silver hake (Merluccius bilinearis), found in the Northwest Atlantic Ocean
Southern hake (Merluccius australis), found off Chile and off New Zealand

Not all hake species are viewed as commercially important, but the deep-water and shallow-water hakes are known to grow rapidly and make up the majority of harvested species.

Commercial use
The highest demand for hake has been in Europe. Hake has been primarily divided into three principal levels—fresh, frozen, and frozen fillet. Fresh hake is mainly supplied by European production and imports. Frozen hake and frozen hake fillet are effectively supplied by imports and European processing companies.

This works out to around half of all hake eaten in Europe. Though Spanish consumption of hake and other fish declined in the last decade (second fish consumption in the world after Japan), hake still accounts for about one third of total fish consumption there.

Hake is the most common variety of fish served in Argentina and alongside beef and chicken, Hake Milanesa, is a standard option at all Argentine restaurants that serve Milanesa, which is one of the country's national dishes. 

Other countries that eat a lot of hake include France, Italy, and Portugal.

In Spain, fresh hake are mostly purchased by restaurants through retailers. Nonetheless, processed hake products are distributed by hake wholesalers. Fishmongers, public markets and hypermarkets sell hake in various forms: frozen fillet, fillet skin-on, fillet skin-off, etc.

In France, fish are generally purchased in supermarkets. Due to insufficient European hake, French wholesalers purchase fresh hake from external countries such as Argentina and Namibia, and then export them to Spain. Fresh hake is mostly exported to Spain.

In Italy, hotels, restaurants, supermarkets, and institutional purchasers purchase much seafood. However, retailers and wholesalers purchase most frozen hake fillets to sell in markets.

In Ireland, hake is a popular fish sold freshly from the Atlantic Ocean in supermarkets and by local fishmongers.

In the United Kingdom, hake is used in fish and chips.

In Hungary paprika batter-fried hake ("hekk") is the most sought after fish during the summer, especially in the Balaton area, and open air markets throughout the country

Commercially saleable forms
Hake is sold as frozen, fillets or steaks, fresh, smoked, or salted.

Buying criteria
When buying hake fillet or other hake product, consumers should look for hake with white flesh that is free of signs of browning, dryness, or grayness, and with a seawater fresh smell.

Fisheries
The main catching method of deep-water hake is primarily trawling, and shallow-water hake is mostly caught by inshore trawl and longlining. Hake are mostly found in the Southwest Atlantic (Argentina and Uruguay), Southeast Pacific (Chile and Peru), Southeast Atlantic (Namibia and South Africa), Southwest Pacific (New Zealand), and Mediterranean and Black Sea (Italy, Portugal, Spain, Greece and France).

Over-exploitation
Due to over-fishing, Argentine hake catches have declined drastically. About 80% of adult hake has apparently disappeared from Argentine waters. Argentine hake is not expected to disappear, but the stock may be so low that it is no longer economical for commercial fishing. In addition, this adversely affects Argentine employment, because of many jobs in the fishing industries. Conversely, Argentine hake prices rose due to hake scarcity, reducing exports and affecting the economy. 

In Chile, seafood exports, especially Chilean hake, have decreased dramatically. Hake export has decreased by almost 19 percent. The main cause of this decline is the February 2010 Chile earthquake and tsunami. These disasters destroyed most processing plants, especially manufacturing companies that produce fish meal and frozen fillets.

European hake catches are well below historical levels because of hake depletion in the Mediterranean and Black Sea. However, different factors might have caused this decline, including a too-high Total Annual Catch, unsustainable fishing, ecological problems, juvenile catches, or non-registered catches.

According to the Worldwide Fund for Nature, the only hake species not currently over-fished is Cape hake, found off Namibia. Furthermore, the Namibian Ministry of Fisheries adheres to very strict rules regarding the catch of hake. For example, the closed seasons for hake lasts approximately two months, in September and October, depending on the level of stock. This rule has been applied to ensure the regrowth of the hake population.

Human introduction to non-native areas
Frank Forrester's Fishermens' Guide in 1885 mentions a hake that was transplanted from the coast of Ireland to Cape Cod on the coast of Massachusetts in the United States.  It is uncertain which species it was, but the Fishermens′ Guide stated:This is an Irish salt water fish, similar in appearance to the tom cod. In Galway bay, and other sea inlets of Ireland, the hake is exceedingly abundant, and is taken in great numbers. It is also found in England and France. Since the Irish immigration to America, the hake has followed in the wake of their masters, as it is now found in New York bay, in the waters around Boston, and off Cape Cod. Here it is called the stock fish, and the Bostonians call them poor Johns. It is a singular fact that until within a few years this fish was never seen in America. It does not grow as large here as in Europe, though here they are from ten to eighteen inches [250 to 460 mm] in length. The general color of this fish is a reddish brown, with some golden tints—the sides being of a pink silvery luster.

References

Gadidae
Merlucciidae
Fish common names